Eiteråga or Eiterå is a village in the Dunderland Valley in the municipality of Rana in Nordland county, Norway. The European route E6 highway passes through the village. Stjernen Art and Silver Gallery is a local shop that produces pieces of jewelry from silver and precious stones.

The primary industry for Eiteråga is mainly farming. The Eiterå area was cleared for farming in 1723. Originally, the village was composed of two farms. Since 1749 the village has been centered on four farms, more or less equal in size. The farms were regulated by the Norwegian state in 1925.

River
There is a small river that passes through the village that is also named Eiteråga.  The river name may mean "the cold river" which comes from the Old Norse word: .  The name may also be derived from Proto-Germanic , meaning "something welling forwards".  The river has its source in between the mountains Bomfjellet and Ørtfjellet.

Media gallery

References

External links
 Stjernen  Art and Silver Gallery

Rana, Norway
Valleys of Nordland
Villages in Nordland